Tiruvannamalai district (previously known as Central Arcot, Tiruvannamalai Sambhuvarayar District) is the largest and one of the 38 districts in the state of Tamil Nadu, in South India. It was formed in the year 1989 through the bifurcation of North Arcot into the Tiruvannamalai Sambuvarayar and Vellore Ambedkar districts. The city of Tiruvannamalai is the district headquarters.

The district is divided into 12 Taluks—Arani, Chengam, Tiruvannamalai, Polur, Thandarampattu, Vandavasi, Kalasapakkam, Chetpet, Kilpennathur, Jamunamarathoor, Cheyyar and Vembakkam. As of 2011, the district had a population of 2,464,875 with a sex-ratio of 994 females for every 1,000 males.

History
Tiruvannamalai is one of the most venerated places in Tamil Nadu. In ancient times, the term "Annamalai" meant an inaccessible mountain. The word "Thiru" was prefixed to signify its greatness, and coupled with the two terms, it was called Thiruvannamalai. Thiru means 'holy' or 'sacred' and is traditionally used in front of names in all parts of Tamil Nadu like Thiruneermalai (Lord Ranganatha), Thirunageswaram (Lord Vishnu and Lord Shiva), Thirumayam (Lord Vishnu and Lord Shiva), Thirumayilai (Lord Adikeshava Perumal and Lord Kapali Eshwaran), Tiruvannamalai (Lord Shiva), Thiruchendur (Lord Muruga), Tiruchirappalli (Rockfort Lord Thaiyumanavar and Lord Sriranganathar), Thiruttani (Lord Muruga), Tiruchengode (Lord Shiva), Thiruchitrambalam (Lord Shiva), Thirumanancheri (Lord Shiva), Thirunallar (Lord Shani Eshwaran), Thiruporur (Lord Muruga), Thirukkadaiyur (Lord Shiva), Tirukalukundram (Lord Vedagiriswarar temple), Thirukarugavur (Lord Garbharakshambigai temple), Tirunelveli, Tiruppur, Tiruvallur and many more.

The temple town of Tiruvannamalai is one of the most ancient heritage sites of India and is a centre of the Saiva religion. The Arunachala hill and its environs have been held in great regard by the Tamils for centuries. The temple is grand in conception and architecture and is rich in tradition, history and festivals. The main Deepam festival attracts devotees from far and wide throughout South India. It has historic places besides Tiruvannamalai, Polur, Arani, Vandavasi, Devikapuram connected to East India and French companies. Arani and Vandavasi had important places in the history of pre-independence. In the late Chola period the district was ruled by the Cholan of Sambuvarayar having Padavedu near Arani as HQ. We can now find the fort and note along with a Shiva temple namely Kailasanathar in Arani town.

After independence Tiruvannamalai was under North Arcot District. The civil district of North Arcot was divided into Vellore District and Tiruvannamalai District in October 1989. P. Kolappan was the first Collector of Tiruvannamalai District. On the whole Tiruvannamalai is traditionally rich in Historic and spiritual values but lacks in industrial growth.

Geography 
The district shares borders with Kanchipuram and Chengalpattu districts in the east, Villupuram and Kallakurichi districts in the south, Krishnagiri and Dharmapuri districts in the west, and Vellore, Ranipet and Tirupattur districts  in the north.

Climate 
The average annual rainfall of the study area is 987 mm, out of which 80 percent is received during monsoon. The soils of the study area have an Ustic moisture regime and Hyperthermic temperature regime. Tiruvannamalai District comes under the Eastern Ghats (TN uplands) and Deccan plateau, hot semiarid region with red loamy soil with cropping period of 90 to 150 days. Excepting hills, the district falls in the North Eastern agro climatic zone of Tamil Nadu. The average annual rainfall of the study area is 987.4 mm, out of which 80 percent is received during monsoon. The soils of the study area have an Ustic moisture regime and Hyperthermic temperature regime.

Demographics
According to 2011 census, Tiruvannamalai District had a population of 2,464,875 with a sex-ratio of 994 females for every 1,000 males, much above the national average of 929. A total of 272,569 were under the age of six, constituting 141,205 males and 131,364 females. Scheduled Castes and Scheduled Tribes accounted for 22.94% and 3.69% of the population respectively. The average literacy of the district was 66.%, compared to the national average of 72.99%. The district had a total of 588,836 households. There were a total of 1,238,177 workers, comprising 265,183 cultivators, 351,310 main agricultural labourers, 37,020 in house hold industries, 316,559 other workers, 268,105 marginal workers, 27,458 marginal cultivators, 173,753 marginal agricultural labourers, 9,700 marginal workers in household industries and 57,194 other marginal workers.

At the time of the 2011 census, 94.31% of the population spoke Tamil, 2.66% Urdu and 2.36% Telugu as their first language.

Politics  

|}

Administration
Tiruvannamalai District has an area of 6,191 km2. It is bounded on the north by Vellore District and Tirupattur District, on the east by Kanchipuram District, on the south by Villupuram District, and on the west by Dharmapuri and Krishnagiri districts. Tiruvannamalai District is divided into 3 sub districts (Arani, Tiruvannamalai and Cheyyar), twelve taluks, 27 blocks and 1,061 villages covering an area of 631,205 ha. The twelve taluks of Tiruvannamalai are listed below:

List of cities having population of one lakh and above as per 2011 Census:

Taluks
The district is composed of  Talukas namely Tiruvannamalai taluk, Tiruvannamalai Rural Arani, Cheyyar, Chengam, Polur, Vandavasi, Kalasapakkam, Chetpet Thandarampattu, and Vembakkam

Economy
In the District Arani and Tiruvannamalai regions are the highest revenue-generating regions.

In 2006 the Ministry of Panchayati Raj named Tiruvannamalai one of the country's 250 most backward districts (out of a total of 640). It is one of the six districts in Tamil Nadu currently receiving funds from the Backward Regions Grant Fund Programme (BRGF).

Agriculture
Tiruvannamalai District is known for its two major businesses, agriculture and silk saree weaving. Rice cultivation and processing is one of the biggest businesses in this district. 112013 hectares of paddy cultivation is irrigated by 1965 lakes and 18 reservoirs and small dams. It has 18 regulated markets through which the farmers sell their agri products directly to the government. Through these regulated markets, 271411 metric tonnes of paddy harvested in 2007. There are many rice mills to process paddy found throughout the district. The modern rice mill near Cheyyar is the biggest government owned mill and Arani has around 278 rice mills. Kalambur is also has around 20 Rice mills and known for variety of rice called Kalambur Ponni rice. Kalambur Ponni rice is famous across the state and being shipped to places like Chennai, Coimbatore, Vellore, and the like.

Silk weaving
The district has a large populace of weavers who are specialize in making Silk sarees. Hand looms are often engaged for weaving, although recently some have turned to mechanized methods of using Power looms. Arani taluk contributes high percent of Silk weaving. Arani is the most important revenue earning town in the district. Though the town is not popular off the state, a bulk of India's Silk apparels is produced by the people of Arani.

Industrialization
The district started to industrialize following the establishment of the industrial complex near Cheyyar by the State Industries Promotion Corporation of Tamil Nadu (SIPCOT). This is evidenced by the recent announcements of a  hi-tech Special Economic Zone for automative components, a  electronics hardware park and the commitment from the Taiwanese Shoe Company to set up its unit. In November 2009 the Tamil Nadu cabinet approved the Mahindara and Mahindra's Rs 1800 core automobile project in 450 acres. This unit will produce tractors, SUVs and commercial vehicles and auto parts. Aluminum die cast unit by Ashley Alteams, a joint venture by Ashok Leyland and Finland-based Alteams Oy started its production in January 2010. This High pressure die cast will manufacture automobile and telecommunication components with initial capacity of 7000 ton per year. One of the largest sugar mills in the country - Cheyyar co-operative sugars - is situated near Cheyyar.

Factories
Since Tiruvannamalai District has its capital at Tiruvannamalai City, there are many factories around Tiruvannamalai. Scent factories are large in number due to the high production of flowers around Tiruvannamalai. They are listed as follows: 1. Hindusthan house hold factories, 2. Sarala birla factory of aroma oil, 3. Parthiban cottages aroma oil factory.
The Tamil Nadu government is planning for a SIPCOT at naidumangalam and kilpennathur both near Tiruvannamalai.
Arani has the factories related to rice and silk with in the town and in the Taluk area. As well, there are few other mills near Arani, such as Lakshmi Saraswathi Cotton mills Arni Pvt Ltd and some engineering industry.

Arahanthgiri Jain Math

Arahanthgiri Jain Math is a Jain math that was established at this ancient Jain site on 8 February 1998, at Thirumalai, Near Arani.
The complex includes three Jain caves, four Jain temples and a 16-meter-high sculpture of Neminatha thought to date from the 12th century that is the tallest Jain idol in Tamil Nadu.

Villages
 

Devanambattu
Konaiyur
Mullandrum
Nambedu
Nochimalai
Perungattur
Vadugappattu

See also
List of districts of Tamil Nadu

References

External links

 Official website
 Tiruvannamali district marked on OpenStreetMap

 
Districts of Tamil Nadu
States and territories established in 1989
1989 establishments in Tamil Nadu